born October 1, 1979, better known by his stage name Ryu, is a Japanese record producer, DJ, musician and arranger. In 2000, Ryu, along with kors k won a contest started by Konami, in which composers were to make music such that the winners would get their songs in the next Beatmania IIDX installment. Ryu's entry "Starmine" and kors k's "Clione" won the contest and both songs were featured in Beatmania IIDX 4th Style.

Ryu returned in Beatmania IIDX 9th Style with a remix of Dj taka's "Abyss", and composed more songs in 10th style onwards. Since then, Ryu has become a mainstay composer for Konami's Bemani series as well as a freelance musician. Ryu has become a part of beatnation records, which compose of Kors K, DJ Taka, L.E.D., Sōta Fujimori and DJ Yoshitaka.

He has numerous works outside of Konami as well, including "Orion" from HARDCORE TANO*C's "HARDCORE SYNDROME 2" album and remixes of the famous "Caramelldansen" and "Caipirinha".

Songs

Beatmania IIDX

Beatmania IIDX 4th Style
 starmine

Beatmania IIDX 9th Style
 Abyss -The Heavens Remix- (original song by Takayuki Ishikawa)

Beatmania IIDX 10th Style
 Narcissus At Oasis
 rainbow rainbow
 雪月花

Beatmania IIDX 11 IIDXRED
 AGEHA
 Be quiet

Beatmania IIDX 12 Happy Sky
 Aurora
 in motion
 合体せよ!ストロングイェーガー!! (Ryu☆ remix) (original song by Toshiyuki Kakuta)
 in the Sky (CS version song)

Beatmania IIDX 13 Distorted
 Harmony and Lovely
 So Fabulous!!
 waxing and wanding
 Go Beyond!! (with Sōta Fujimori; CS version song)

Beatmania IIDX 14 Gold
 Dreaming Sweetness
 Second Heaven
 Treasure×Star (with Naoki Maeda and Sachimayu; CS version song)

Beatmania IIDX 15 DJ Troopers
 Blue Rain (with Takayuki Ishikawa)
 Dazzlin' Darlin
 Time to Air
 Do it!! Do it!!
 VOX UP (with Shinji Hosoe); CS version song)

Beatmania IIDX 16 Empress
 Mind Mapping
 まほろば (with Kanako Hoshino)
 3y3s
 RIZING YOU UP [CS version song]

Beatmania IIDX 17 SIRIUS
 bloomin' feeling
 Light Shine
 mosaic

Beatmania IIDX 18 Resort Anthem
 Mermaid girl
 passionate fate
 PARADISE LOST (with Toshiyuki Kakuta)

Beatmania IIDX 19 Lincle
 Follow Tomorrow (with Starving Trancer and Mayumi Morinaga)
 Thunderbolt
 NNRT

Beatmania IIDX 20 Tricoro
 405nm (Ryu☆mix) (with Starving Trancer)
 Fly you to the star (with Starving Trancer and Mayumi Morinaga)
 Plan 8

Beatmania IIDX 21 Spada
 BLUE DRAGON(雷龍RemixIIDX)
 Critical Crystal
 Dark Fall
 ra'am

Beatmania IIDX 22 Pendual
 Line 4 Ruin
 We're So Happy (P*Light Remix) IIDX Ver.

Beatmania IIDX 23 Copula
 Donkey Donk
 AO-1
 Derelict Star feat. Ryu*
 Everlasting Last 
 STARLiGHT
 NZM (with Kosuke Saito

Beatmania IIDX 24 Sinobuz
 ¡Viva!
 OOO
 Go Ahead!! (with Fujimori Sota)
 AO-∞ 
 Mare Nectaris

Beatmania IIDX 25 Cannon Ballers
 O/D*20
 VOX RUSH
 SUNLiGHT(IIDX MIX) 
 255

Beatmania IIDX 26 Rootage
 CoMAAAAAAA
 Night! Night! Night!

Beatmania IIDX 27 Heroic Verse
 Beautiful Harmony (IIDX Mix)

Dance Dance Revolution

Dance Dance Revolution Universe 3
 sakura storm
 Vertical (Available as Xbox Live Download Content)

Dance Dance Revolution X2
 Sakura Sunrise

Dance Dance Revolution X3 VS 2ndMIX
 COME BACK TO MY HEART (with Starving Trancer and Mayumi Morinaga)
 I/O

Dance Dance Revolution 2013
 ずっとみつめていて (Ryu☆Remix) (with DJ UTO, Starving Trancer, and Mayumi Morinaga)

Dance Dance Revolution 2014
 Din Don Dan

pop'n music

pop'n mMusic 12 いろは
 starmine (pop'n mix)

pop'n music 14 FEVER!
 hora de verdad (with Jun Wakita)

pop'n music 16 PARTY♪
 SPICY PIECE (Ryu☆ Remix) (original song by Tomonori Ikeda)

pop'n music 18 せんごく列伝
 Ignited Night

pop'n music 19 TUNE STREET
 ナタラディーン (Raja Maharaja mix) (original song by Yuki Kume)

pop'n music 20 fantasia
 朧 (with Starving Trancer and Mayumi Morinaga)

Guitar Freaks & Drum Mania

GuitarFreaks XG2 & DrumMania XG2: Groove to Live
 Right on time (Ryu☆ Remix) (Original song by Mutsuhiko Izumi)

GuitarFreaks XG3 & DrumMania XG3
 I'm so Happy (Rockin' ver.)

GITADORA
 Run Run
 Sakura Sunrise (GITADORA ver.)

jubeat

jubeat
 bass 2 bass

jubeat knit
 I'm so Happy

jubeat copious
 800 nm
 532 nm

jubeat saucer
 We're so Happy

jubeat Qubell
 檄

jubeat clan
 Couleur=Blanche (with Yoshitaka Nishimura)

REFLEC BEAT

REFLEC BEAT
 Sakura Reflection
 KOROBUSHKA (Ryu Remix)
 中華急行 (China Express) (ver. 1.5)

REFLEC BEAT limelight
 Castle on the Moon
 Mermaid girl (Ryu☆ Remix)
 STARS (Ryu☆ Remix RR ver.) (with Starving Trancer and Mayumi Morinaga)

REFLEC BEAT colette
 Blade
 Honey Party
 it's my miracle (with Starving Trancer)
 Like+it!
 Sakura Luminance

REFLEC BEAT groovin'!!
 Sakura Mirage

BEMANI-wide
 Engraved Mark

Exit Trance Presents Anime Trance
Butter-fly (Digimon Adventure opening theme) (from EXIT TRANCE PRESENTS ANIME TRANCE BEST 1)
 (Rozen Maiden: Träumend opening theme) (from EXIT TRANCE PRESENTS ANIME TRANCE BEST 1, COMPLETE BEST)
 (Bokurano opening theme) (from EXIT TRANCE PRESENTS ANIME TRANCE BEST 1, COMPLETE BEST)
 (RahXephon opening theme) (from EXIT TRANCE PRESENTS ANIME TRANCE BEST 2, COMPLETE BEST)
JOINT (Shakugan no Shana Second opening theme) (from EXIT TRANCE PRESENTS ANIME TRANCE BEST 3)
 (.hack//Roots ending theme) (from EXIT TRANCE PRESENTS ANIME TRANCE BEST 4)
 (BLEACH ending theme) (from EXIT TRANCE PRESENTS ANIME TRANCE BEST 5)
Tears Infection (Myself;Yourself opening theme) (from EXIT TRANCE PRESENTS ANIME TRANCE BEST 5)
Butter-Fly (Digimon Adventure opening theme) (from EXIT TRANCE PRESENTS ANIME TRANCE COMPLETE BEST)
 (Buso Renkin opening theme) (from EXIT TRANCE PRESENTS ANIME TRANCE COMPLETE BEST)

Other works
Under The Sky (RyuRemix) (from the album "cyber beatnation 1st conclusion")
THE SAFARI -RyuRemix- (from dj TAKA's album "milestone")
INFINITE PRAYER -RyuRemix- (from L.E.D.'s album "denjin-k")
The Hope Of Tomorrow -RyuRemix- (from Sōta Fujimori's album "SYNTHESIZED")
orion (from the HARDCORE TANO*C album "HARDCORE SYNDROME 2")
ウッーウッーウマウマ(ﾟ∀ﾟ) (Ryu Remix) [from ウッーウッーウマウマ(ﾟ∀ﾟ)]
Kick Out 仮面 -RyuRemix- (from Keiichi Ueno's album "Rewind!")
ZUTTO MITSUMETE ITE (Ryu Remix)
Ribbon (from the game Walk It Out!)
Soft Paws (from the game Walk It Out!)

References

External links
beatnation Records official site

1979 births
Japanese composers
Japanese male composers
Japanese DJs
Living people
Happy hardcore musicians
Video game composers